The Historian is a history journal published quarterly by Taylor & Francis on behalf of the history honor society, Phi Alpha Theta. The journal was established in 1938. The Historian publishes original articles and book reviews in all areas of historical scholarship.

Abstracting and indexing 
The journal is abstracted and indexed in EBSCO, Arts and Humanities Citation Index, ATLA Religion Database, Current Contents/Arts & Humanities, Historical Abstracts, InfoTrac, ProQuest, Worldwide Political Sciences Abstracts.

See also 
List of history journals

References

External links 
 
 The Historian's Book Review Section website

History journals
Wiley-Blackwell academic journals
Publications established in 1938
English-language journals
Quarterly journals
Magazines published in Rhode Island